The 14 December 2008 Egyptian bus accident happened when a bus plunged into an irrigation ditch while traveling from Cairo to Minya killing at least fifty-five and injuring ten. From multiple sources, the accident happened when the bus driver swerved to avoid an oncoming truck, but others said that he lost control while trying to overtake another vehicle.

External links
BBC News – Dozens killed in Egypt bus plunge

2008 road incidents
Bus incidents in Egypt
2008 in Egypt